DePaolo is a surname. Notable people with the surname include:

Pete DePaolo (1898–1980), American race car driver
Donald J. DePaolo (born 1951), American professor of geochemistry

See also
DiPaolo